The 1st Tennessee Infantry Regiment (also known as the "First Tennessee") was an infantry regiment in the Confederate States Army during the Civil War, and was successively commanded by Colonels George Maney and Hume R. Field.

History
The Regiment was originally organized on the 9th of May in 1861. It was officially mustered into Confederate service on August 1st of the same year. George Maney, who commanded the Rock City Guards battalion which became companies A, B and C, was elected colonel for the first 90 days. After that, command passed to Hume Field. Confederate martyr Sam Davis joined the regiment as a scout, but he was later executed as a spy by Union forces despite his wearing a butternut Confederate uniform when he was captured.

See also
List of Tennessee Confederate Civil War units
Rock City Guards

Notes

References

Further reading 

1861 establishments in Tennessee
1865 disestablishments in North Carolina
Military units and formations established in 1861
Military units and formations disestablished in 1865
Units and formations of the Confederate States Army from Tennessee